Club Deportivo La Unión was a Spanish football team based in La Unión, Murcia. Founded in 2001 and dissolved in 2011, it played its last season in Tercera División – Group 13, holding home games at Polideportivo Municipal de La Unión, with a capacity for 2,000 spectators.

History
In 2004, three years after being founded, La Unión first reached Tercera División, finishing twice in the top four over the course of seven seasons, but consecutively falling short in the promotion playoffs. In July 2009, it became FC Cartagena's reserve team. 

Before the 2011–12 season started, the relationship between Cartagena and La Unión came to an end.

Club background
Club Deportivo La Unión — (2001–09)
Fútbol Club Cartagena-La Unión — (2009–11)
Club Deportivo La Unión — (2011)

Season to season

7 seasons in Tercera División

References

External links
Former official website

Association football clubs established in 2001
Association football clubs disestablished in 2011
Defunct football clubs in the Region of Murcia
2001 establishments in Spain
2011 disestablishments in Spain